Toyokawa Station (豊川駅) is the name of two train stations in Japan:

 Toyokawa Station (Aichi)
 Toyokawa Station (Osaka)